Elton Dean (28 October 1945 –  8 February 2006) was an English jazz musician who performed on alto saxophone, saxello (a variant of the soprano saxophone) and occasionally keyboards. Part of the Canterbury scene, he featured in Soft Machine, among others.

Life and career
Dean was born in Nottingham, England, moving to Tooting, London, soon after his birth. From 1966 to 1967, Dean was a member of the band Bluesology, led by Long John Baldry. The band's pianist, Reginald Dwight, afterward combined Dean's and Baldry's first names for his own stage name, Elton John. This fact is alluded to in the 2019 film Rocketman, a biopic of the life and career of Elton John, where Dean is portrayed by Evan Walsh,  however the film fictionally cites John Lennon as the inspiration for Elton John's taken surname.

Dean established his reputation as a member of the Keith Tippett Sextet from 1968 to 1970, and in the band Soft Machine from 1969 to 1972. Shortly before leaving Soft Machine he started his own group, Just Us.

From 1975 to 1978 he led a nine-piece band called Ninesense, performing at the Bracknell Jazz Festival and similar events. Following this, his own groups were usually quartets or quintets, and most often worked in the free jazz mode, with little or no pre-composed material, such as Soft Heap with Mark Hewins. However, he also continued to work with other groups that were very composition-based, such as guitarist Phil Miller's In Cahoots, drummer Pip Pyle's Equipe Out, and various projects with former Soft Machine bassist Hugh Hopper.

In 2002, Dean and three other former Soft Machine members (Hugh Hopper, drummer John Marshall, and guitarist Allan Holdsworth) toured and recorded under the name Soft Works.  With another former Soft Machine member, guitarist John Etheridge, replacing Holdsworth, they subsequently toured and recorded as Soft Machine Legacy, playing some pieces from the original Soft Machine repertoire as well as new works. Featuring Dean, three albums of the Legacy have been released: Live in Zaandam (CD, rec. 2005/05/10), New Morning - The Paris Concert (DVD, rec. 2005/12/12) and the studio album Soft Machine Legacy (CD, 2006, rec. 2005).

Dean's last musical collaborations also included those with Soft Bounds, a quartet composed of Dean, Hugh Hopper, Sophia Domancich and Simon Goubert, and also with Alex Maguire's project Psychic Warrior.

Dean died on 8 February 2006 after more than a year of heart and liver problems. He was replaced in Soft Machine Legacy by Theo Travis.

Discography

As leader

1971:  Elton Dean (reissued as Just Us)
1975: Live at the BBC (with Ninesense, released 2003)
1976: Oh! For The Edge
1976: They All Be On This Old Road (live)
1977: Happy Daze (live)
1979: Three's Company Two's A Crowd
1979: The 100 Club Concert (released posthumously in 2012)
1980: Boundaries
1985: The Bologna Tape
1986: Welcomet
1988: Duos (cassette only)
1988: Trios (cassette only)
1989: EDQ Live (cassette only)
1989: Unlimited Saxophone Company
1990: Vortex Tapes (live)
1995: Silent Knowledge
1997: Headless Quartet
1997: Newsense
1998: Moorsong
2000: QED
2002: Sea of Infinity

Collaborations

1976: Dean, Hopper, Tippett, Gallivan: Cruel But Fair
1977: Dean, Skidmore: El Skid
1977: Dean, Wheeler, Gallivan: The Cheque Is In The Mail
1977: Dean, Hopper, Tippett, Gallivan: Mercy Dash
1985: Dean, Miller: Steve Miller Trio Meets Elton Dean
1990: Dean, Howard Riley Quartet: All The Tradition
1992: Dean, Hewins: Bar Torque
1993: Dean, Riley: One Two One
1995: Dean, Dunmall: If Dubois Only Knew
1995: Dean, Riley: Descending Circles
1996: Dean, Rudd: Rumours Of An Incident
1996: Dean, Cuomo: The Origin Of Man
1997: Dean, Hopper, Clarke, Knight: The Mind In The Trees
1998: Dean, Bellatalla, Sanders: Into The Nierika
2000: Dean, Trovesi: Freedom in Jazz
2004: Dean, Domancich: Avant
2004: Dean, Dunmall, Rogers, Blanco: Remembrance (released posthumously in 2013)
2005: Dean, Wilkinson, Bianco: Freebeat - Northern Lights
2007: Dean, The Wrong Object: The Unbelievable Truth (recorded live in Paris at Glaz'Art on 18 October 2005)

Bands

with Soft Machine (see Soft Machine discography for live albums)
1970: Third
1971: Fourth
1972: Fifth
Other bands
1971: Centipede: Septober Energy
1978: Soft Head: Rogue Element
1979: Soft Heap: Al Dente (live)
1979: Soft Heap: Soft Heap
1983: Soft Heap: A Veritable Centaur
1985: Pip Pyle's Equip' Out: L'Equipe Out
1989: In Cahoots: Live 86–89
1990: Anglo Italian Quartet: Put It Right Mr. Smoothie
1990: l'Equip' Out: Up!
1995: British Saxophone Quartet: Early October
1995: Anglo Italian Quartet: Twice Upon A Time
2002: Soft Works: Abracadabra
2003: Soft Mountain: Soft Mountain
2004: Soft Bounds: Live at Le Triton
2005: Soft Machine Legacy: Live in Zaandam
2006: Soft Machine Legacy: Soft Machine Legacy

Appearances

1969: Julie Driscoll: 69
1970: Keith Tippett: You Are Here... I Am There
1970: Kevin Ayers: BBC Sessions 1970-1976
1970: Robert Wyatt: The End Of An Ear
1971: Keith Tippett: Dedicated To You, But You Weren't Listening
1971: Heads Hands & Feet: Heads Hands & Feet
1971: Reg King: Reg King
1972: Mike Hugg: Somewhere
1973: Alexis Korner: Alexis Korner
1973: Mike Hugg: Stress & Strain
1974: Hugh Hopper: Monster Band
1975: 	Brotherhood of Breath: Bremen to Bridgwater
1975: 	Dudu Pukwana: Diamond Express
1975: 	Julie Tippetts: Sunset Glow
1976: Hugh Hopper: Hoppertunity Box
1976: 	Intercontinental Express: London
1978: Keith Tippett: Frames
1978: Carla Bley Band: European Tour 1977
1979: John Stevens Dance Orchestra: A Luta Continua
1981: National Health: DS Al Coda
1984: Keith Tippett: A Loose Kite in a Gentle Wind...
1984: 	The Big Team: Under The Influence
1985: 	Phil Miller: Cutting Both Ways
1985: 	Harry Beckett: Pictures of You
1987: 	Dennis Gonzalez Dallas-London Sextet: Catechism
1988: 	Phil Miller: Split Seconds
1991: 	Joe Gallivan's Soldiers Of The Road: Innocence
1994: 	John Greaves: Songs
1996: MASHU: Elephants in your head?
1999: Roswell Rudd: Broad Strokes
2003: 	Psychic Warrior: Psychic Warrior
2003: 	Carol Grimes: Mother
2003: 	Hugh Hopper: Jazzloops
2003: 	In Cahoots: All That
2005: 	The Wrong Object featuring Elton Dean: The Unbelievable Truth

Notes

References

External links
 Discography
 Extended Biography
 AllAboutJazz.com: "Former Soft Machine saxophone player Elton Dean dies"
  - interview for Facelift Magazine.

1945 births
2006 deaths
20th-century English musicians
21st-century English musicians
English rock saxophonists
English jazz alto saxophonists
British male saxophonists
English jazz soprano saxophonists
English record producers
English songwriters
English rock musicians
Jazz-rock musicians
British rhythm and blues boom musicians
People from Tooting
Musicians from London
People from Nottingham
Canterbury scene
Soft Machine members
20th-century saxophonists
21st-century saxophonists
Soft Heap members
In Cahoots members
Centipede (band) members
20th-century British male musicians
21st-century British male musicians
British male jazz musicians
The Dedication Orchestra members
Bluesology members
British male songwriters
NoBusiness Records artists
Ogun Records Artists